The Lilava district, also known as the Leilabad district is one of the districts of the Iranian city of Tabriz which was predominantly, and at times exclusively, inhabited by Armenians. At the beginning of the 20th century, the Armenian community of Tabriz, which numbered some 6,000, lived in the districts of Lilava and Ḡala (Armenian: Berdaṭʿał). The district played a crucial role in the early years of the Armenian Revolutionary Federation.

See also
 Baron Avak

References

Sources
 
 
 

 

Districts of Tabriz